Chris Neild (born December 1, 1987) is a former American football nose tackle that played in the National Football League (NFL). He was drafted by the Washington Redskins in the seventh round of the 2011 NFL Draft. He played college football at West Virginia University. He attended Stroudsburg High School in Stroudsburg, Pennsylvania.

Professional career

2011 NFL Combine

Washington Redskins

2011 season
Neild was drafted in the seventh round of the 2011 NFL Draft by the Washington Redskins. He was converted from a defensive tackle to a nose tackle. Neild made his NFL debut in Week 1 against the New York Giants, where he recorded 1.5 sacks on Eli Manning. In the 2011 season, Neild played in all 16 games as the backup nose tackle for Barry Cofield.

2012 season
Neild was expected to compete for a roster spot with Chris Baker. His second season was cut short after tearing the anterior cruciate ligament in his left knee during practice on August 13, 2012. The Redskins waived-injured him two days later. After not being claimed off waivers, Neild was officially placed on the team's injured reserve list.

2013 season
During the 2013 season, Neild returned to being the back-up nose tackle and played a total of eight games.

2014 season
In the last 2014 preseason game against the Tampa Bay Buccaneers, Neild suffered an injury in his right leg and was carted off the field. On August 30, 2014, it was confirmed that he tore his right ACL and was placed on the team's injured reserve.

Houston Texans
Neild signed with the Houston Texans on July 31, 2015. He was waived on August 31, 2015.

References

External links
 Washington Redskins bio
 West Virginia Mountaineers bio

1987 births
Living people
American football defensive tackles
Houston Texans players
People from Cliffside Park, New Jersey
People from Stroudsburg, Pennsylvania
Players of American football from New Jersey
Players of American football from Pennsylvania
Sportspeople from Bergen County, New Jersey
Sportspeople from the New York metropolitan area
West Virginia Mountaineers football players
Washington Redskins players